The German Junior Bowl, usually only referred to as Junior Bowl, is the annual national championship game for junior teams in the sport of American football in Germany. It is contested by the two best teams of the GFL Juniors.

It is the second-oldest still existing bowl game in Germany, after the German Bowl, dating back to 1982. Record winners are the Düsseldorf Panther, who celebrated their 15th success and their 16th Junior Bowl appearance in 2010.

History
The first edition of the Junior Bowl was held in 1982 and became a recognised national championship in the following year. Until 2000, regional championships were held rather than a national league. The regional champions then participated in the play-offs to determine the national champion.

In 2001, the GFL Juniors was introduced. The league consisted, for the most part of its existence, of twelve teams, split into three regional divisions, north, central and south, with four teams each. The best eight clubs then took part in the play-offs to determine the two teams that will play in the Junior Bowl.

Like Germany's elite league, the German Football League, the GFL Juniors will be expanded for the 2011 season and play with four regional divisions of five teams each. However, the new western division will play with only four clubs as the Langenfeld Longhorns have withdrawn from the league. In 2012, the divisions will then expand to six teams each, taking the number of elite level junior clubs to 24.

Junior Bowls 
The Junior Bowls since 1982:

By game

By team 

 † Bold denotes Junior Bowl victory.

References

External links
  GFL Juniors website
  German Football League official website
  German American Football Association website
  Football History Historic American football tables from Germany

Junior Bowl
Recurring sporting events established in 1982
Annual events in Germany
1982 establishments in West Germany
American football bowls in Europe